Lekshmana Chandra Victoria Gowri is an Additional Judge of the Madras High Court. Prior to her appointment, she was a politician from the Bharatiya Janata Party. Her selection engendered controversy after lawyers alleged her to have given hate speeches against religious minorities and unsuccessfully petitioned the Supreme Court of India to withdraw the appointment.

Education 
Gowri received her Bachelor of Laws from Government Law College, Madurai and did her postgraduation from Mother Teresa Women's University.

Career

Politics 
Gowri's family has been associated with the Bharatiya Janata Party (BJP) since decades. She has been associated with Seva Bharati — an affiliate of the Sangh Parivar— since her college days. In October 2010, Gowri was appointed to head the party's Women's Wing in Kerala. In 2016, she was appointed as the National Secretary of the women’s wing. The Print reports that Gowri's social media profile has photographs of her tying rakhi on Narendra Modi and other senior BJP leaders; during the 2019 Indian general election, she took part in the Main Bhi Chowkidar campaign.

Law 
Gowri started practice in 1995 and opened her own firrm, two years hence.  In 2015, the union government—led by BJP—appointed her as their senior standing counsel at the Madras High Court; five years later, she was recruited as an assistant solicitor general for the union government.

Elevation to High Court 
On 17 January 2023, the Collegium of the Supreme Court of India assented to her elevation as a judge of the Madras High Court. About a fortnight later, it was alleged that she had given hate speeches against religious minorities — Christians and Muslims; Gowri was noted to have propagated the Islamophobic conspiratorial theory of Love jihad and labeled Christians as "white terrorists". On 1 February, some lawyers petitioned the President of India to withdraw her appointment and went on to file a case before the Supreme Court of India, praying for similar reliefs.

On 6 February 2023, the Chief Justice of India — who heads the Collegium —  constituted a two-judge bench to decide on the issue about a week later; in oral remarks, he appeared to accept an ignorance of Gowri's speeches. However, minutes after the decision, the Government accepted the Collegium's recommendation, and the Chief Justice of Madras High Court requested her to take oath, the next day. The hearing was rescheduled and held before a bench of Bhushan Ramkrishna Gavai and Sanjay Kishan Kaul on the morning of 7 January; they dismissed the case upon an oral hearing, refusing to challenge the wisdom of the collegium by adjudicating the "suitability" of a judge.

Gowri was sworn in simultaneous to the hearings, and she took oath before the arguments had concluded in the Supreme Court; the proceedings would have been effectively infructuos even in case of an unfavorable verdict. The Hindu, in its editorial, remarked that Gowri's elevation — notwithstanding an "unabashed prejudice against minorities" — highlighted the unsuitability of the closed-door collegium system to select judges in the face of political pressure.

Personal life 
Gowri is married, and has two daughters.

Notes

References 

Living people
Year of birth missing (living people)
21st-century Indian judges
21st-century Indian women judges
Judges of the Madras High Court
Bharatiya Janata Party politicians
21st-century Indian politicians
21st-century Indian women politicians